MS Stena Seafarer was a ro-ro ferry that operated on the service between Larne, Northern Ireland and Fleetwood, England.

She was built in 1975 for Stena Line as Union Melbourne, before being renamed Union Trader in 1980.  In the same year, the ship was acquired by P&O Irish Sea, becoming Puma, then European Seafarer in 1998.  In 2004 Stena Line the vessel transferred from P&O Irish Sea to Stena Line. In 2004 the ship was renamed to Stena Seafarer.

Following Stena Line's announcement in late 2010 that they were to close the Larne to Fleetwood service in the following year the ship was sold to Anship and renamed Ant 2. She was scrapped at Aliaga in 2014.

References 

Ferries of the United Kingdom
Ferries of Northern Ireland
Ferries of England
1975 ships